Thomas Olivier Amang A Kegueni (born 9 February 1998) is a Cameroonian footballer who plays as a forward for Orange County SC in the USL Championship.

Career

Molde
Amang signed for Norwegian side Molde FK on 9 February 2016, his 18th birthday. He made his debut for the club in their 4–2 victory over Lillestrøm on 1 April 2016, coming on as a 69th minute substitute for Fredrik Gulbrandsen.

Loan to Kristiansund
On 24 March 2019, Amang joined Kristiansund BK on loan for the 2019 season.

Gimnàstic
On 26 August 2019, Amang signed a two-year contract with Gimnàstic de Tarragona in the Spanish Segunda División B.

Colorado Springs Switchbacks
On 16 July 2021, Amang signed with USL Championship side Colorado Springs Switchbacks.

San Diego Loyal
On 23 February 2022, Amang was traded to USL Championship side San Diego Loyal in exchange for Haji Abdikadir.

Orange County SC
On 3 March 2023, Amang moved to USL Championship side Orange County SC for their 2023 season.

Career statistics

References

External links

Molde Profile

1998 births
Living people
Footballers from Douala
Cameroonian footballers
Association football forwards
Eliteserien players
Molde FK players
Kristiansund BK players
Segunda División B players
Gimnàstic de Tarragona footballers
Colorado Springs Switchbacks FC players
San Diego Loyal SC players
Orange County SC players
Cameroonian expatriate footballers
Cameroonian expatriate sportspeople in Norway
Cameroonian expatriate sportspeople in Spain
Cameroonian expatriate sportspeople in the United States
Expatriate footballers in Norway
Expatriate footballers in Spain
Expatriate soccer players in the United States